During the 2002–03 English football season, Blackburn Rovers competed in the FA Premier League.

Season summary
After a season of consolidation in the Premiership the previous season (capped with victory in the League Cup), Blackburn Rovers enjoyed their best season since winning the title in 1995, finishing in sixth place and qualifying for the UEFA Cup for the second year in a row. While their UEFA Cup campaign was not especially impressive (only beating CSKA Sofia on away goals before being knocked out by eventual runners-up Celtic), their continued progress under Graeme Souness gave the fans much hope for the following season. Blackburn also embarked on another strong run in the League Cup for the second successive year, although they failed to defend their title after suffering a 4-2 aggregate defeat to Manchester United in the semi-finals. The star man for Blackburn this season was American goalkeeper Brad Friedel, who was named as the goalkeeper in the PFA Team of the Year.

Final league table

First-team squad
Squad at end of season

Left club during season

Reserve squad

Statistics

Appearances and goals

|-
! colspan=14 style=background:#dcdcdc; text-align:center| Goalkeepers

|-
! colspan=14 style=background:#dcdcdc; text-align:center| Defenders

|-
! colspan=14 style=background:#dcdcdc; text-align:center| Midfielders

|-
! colspan=14 style=background:#dcdcdc; text-align:center| Forwards

|-
! colspan=14 style=background:#dcdcdc; text-align:center| Players transferred out during the season

Starting 11
Considering starts in all competitions
 GK: #1,  Brad Friedel, 47
 RB: #2,  Lucas Neill, 45
 CB: #14,  Nils-Eric Johansson, 27 (#20,  David Thompson, has 32 starts)
 CB: #21,  Martin Taylor, 38
 LB: #6,  Craig Short, 29
 RM: #7,  Garry Flitcroft, 39
 CM: #8,  David Dunn, 33
 CM: #3,  Tugay Kerimoğlu, 42
 LM: #11,  Damien Duff, 31
 CF: #19,  Dwight Yorke, 35
 CF: #9,  Andy Cole, 40

Transfers

In
  Andy Todd -  Charlton Athletic, 22 May, £750,000 (rising to £1,000,000 depending on appearances)
  Sebastian Pelzer -  1. FC Kaiserslautern II, 25 June, undisclosed
  Dwight Yorke -  Manchester United, 26 July, £2,000,000 (rising to £2,600,000 depending on appearances and team performance)
  David Thompson -  Coventry City, 29 August, £1,500,000 (rising to £2,500,000 depending on player and team performances)
  Hakan Şükür - unattached (last played for  Parma), 4 December, free
  Vratislav Greško -  Parma, 11 February, four-month loan

Out
  Mark Hughes - released, 13 May
  Simon Grayson -  Blackpool, 19 July, free
  Hakan Ünsal -  Galatasaray, 27 August, £650,000
  Matt Jansen -  Coventry City, 18 February, four-month loan 
  Stig Inge Bjørnebye - retired, 11 March
  Alan Miller - retired, 7 April
  James Thomas - released

Results

Premier League

Results by matchday

FA Cup

League Cup

UEFA Cup

Scores Overview

References

External links
FootballSquads - Blackburn Rovers - 2002/03

Blackburn Rovers F.C. seasons
Black